Kau or KAU may refer to:
Kau (bull), a legendary bull in Meitei mythology
Kau, Hawaii, the southernmost district on the island of Hawaii
Kauhava Airfield, an airport in Kauhava, Finland (IATA airport code KAU)
Kau River, Mizoram, India
Kõue Manor or Kau, in Estonia
Karlstad University
Kenya African Union
Kerala Agricultural University
King Abdulaziz University, Jeddah, Saudi Arabia
Korea Aerospace University, Goyang, South Korea